Olga Kolobova is a Russian soprano opera singer, a leading soloist of the Novosibirsk Opera and Ballet Theatre.

Early life and education
The future opera singer grew up in a musical atmosphere. Her mother played the piano well, but she had a weak voice, while her grandmother, on the contrary, had, according to memories of Olga Kolobova, "a truly operatic voice" ("по-настоящему оперный голос"). The girl herself was also fond of singing. The child liked to listen to Mozart's compositions, which were performed by her mother on the piano. In addition, the family had a collection of gramophone records, including those with opera music.

At first, Olga Kolobova entered the Tomsk Polytechnic University but soon stopped studying at this educational institution. Then she entered the Tomsk School of Music where her music teacher was S. N. Kravchenko. After that, she studied at the Novosibirsk Conservatory (class of Professor N. I. Lubyanovskaya), from which she graduated in 2002. In the same year Kolobova started her career at the Novosibirsk Opera Theatre.

Career at the Novosibirsk Opera and Ballet Theatre
The singer recalls with great warmth her participation in such works as the opera Life with an Idiot by Alfred Schnittke, the opera Bluebeard's Castle by Béla Bartók.

She takes an active part in the concert programs of the theater, which, in her opinion, are a good addition to the repertoire of the Big Stage (for example, the Masterpieces of Russian Romance cycle).

Kolobova also participates in opera projects for children: in the 77th theatrical season, she played the role of Mother in The Kid and Carlson (сomposer Anton Gladkikh) based on the work of Astrid Lindgren, as well as the role of Froska in the Morozko (music by Mikhail Krasev).

She toured Moscow, Italy, Germany and South Korea with a theatre troupe.

Awards
Olga Kolobova is a diploma winner of the All-Russian Competition, a laureate of the 1st Prize of the 1st Sannicandro di Bari International Music Competition in Italy, a diploma winner of the Golden Mask National Theater Festival (The Best Female Role in the Opera Nomination), a laureate of the Kings of Fine Arts Award (2021), she also won the Paradise Theater Award in the Best Female Role in Musical Theater Nomination for her performance of the leading role in Turandot by Giacomo Puccini.

References

Living people
21st-century Russian women opera singers
Russian operatic sopranos
Musicians from Novosibirsk
Tomsk Polytechnic University alumni
Novosibirsk Opera and Ballet Theatre
Novosibirsk Conservatory alumni
Year of birth missing (living people)